Robert Lee Brumley (September 24, 1919 – March 31, 2009) was an American football player. 

Born in Edinburg, Texas, Roberson played college football for Rice and Oklahoma. He was the leading scorer in the Big Six Conference in 1943 and was selected by the United Press as a first-team back on the 1943 All-Big Six Conference football team. After the war, he played professional football in the National Football League (NFL) as a back for the Detroit Lions. He appeared in one NFL game during the 1945 season.

References

1919 births
2009 deaths
Rice Owls football players
Oklahoma Sooners football players
Detroit Lions players
People from Edinburg, Texas
Players of American football from Texas
United States Navy personnel of World War II